MGM Resorts International is an American global hospitality and entertainment company operating destination resorts in Las Vegas, Massachusetts, Michigan, Mississippi, Maryland, Ohio, and New Jersey, including Bellagio, Mandalay Bay, MGM Grand, and Park MGM.

The company began operations in 1987 as MGM Grand, Inc. and became MGM Mirage in 2000, after acquiring Mirage Resorts. In the mid-2000s, growth of its non-gaming (lodging, food, retail) revenue began to outpace gaming receipts and demand for high-rise condominiums was surging, with median property prices in Las Vegas twice the national average. The company shifted its focus from owning and operating resorts and casinos to developing and building real estate in the leisure and gaming industry—launching the massive CityCenter mixed-use project, which was at the time of its construction the world's largest construction site and ranks as one of the most expensive real estate projects in history. City Center's development coincided with the global financial crisis, causing more than $1 billion in writedowns in its valuation.

Billionaire investor Kirk Kerkorian and his Tracinda Corporation were, until 2009, the majority shareholders of MGM Mirage;  Kerkorian was the former owner of the Metro-Goldwyn-Mayer movie studio, from which MGM Grand derived its name. Following a $1 billion stock offering by MGM Mirage amidst the global credit crunch, Tracinda's shares were diluted from 53.8 percent to 39 percent. On June 15, 2010, shareholders voted for MGM Mirage to change its name to "MGM Resorts International".

In 2015, the company split into two forming MGM Growth Properties, a real estate company, while MGM Resorts shifted to operating properties.

History

Background and early ventures (1969–1988)
The company's background can be traced to 1969, when airline and casino tycoon Kirk Kerkorian bought a controlling stake in the Metro-Goldwyn-Mayer (MGM) film studio. In 1970 and 1971, Kerkorian struggled with debt from his acquisitions of MGM and Western Airlines, and was forced to sell a majority of his casino company, International Leisure, to Hilton Hotels at a steep discount. When the Las Vegas Hilton, the casino he had built, subsequently became the most successful hotel in Las Vegas, Kerkorian was inspired to lead the studio into the gambling industry. It opened the original MGM Grand Hotel and Casino (now Horseshoe Las Vegas) in 1973. The MGM Grand Reno followed in 1978.

By 1979, the two hotel-casinos accounted for most of MGM's income, and the company announced a plan to split itself in two. The next year, the film studio was spun off as a new company, while the original company, renamed as MGM Grand Hotels Inc., retained the two hotel-casinos. Kerkorian held a 47 percent stake in both companies.

In 1985, Kerkorian began seeking a buyer for MGM Grand Hotels, to allow him to concentrate on running United Artists and on developing new properties under the MGM Grand name. A deal was reached for Bally Manufacturing to buy the company; the deal closed in April 1986, and the two casinos were renamed under the Bally's brand. The terms of the sale allowed Kerkorian to retain rights to the MGM Grand name, and plans were announced to offer the stockholders of MGM Grand Hotels shares in a new company that would hold the naming rights.

The company now known as MGM Resorts International was formed in 1986 as Grand Name Co. as a subsidiary of Kerkorian's Tracinda Corporation. It was renamed in 1987 as MGM Grand, Inc.

The company's first venture was MGM Grand Air, a luxury airline offering service between New York and Los Angeles, which launched in September 1987. The company also made an offer to take over financially struggling Pan American World Airways, but this offer was rejected by Pan Am's board in November 1987.

In August 1987, MGM Grand bid $152 million for the bankrupt Dunes Hotel in Las Vegas, but was beat out by Japanese billionaire Masao Nangaku. Instead, the company acquired the Desert Inn and Sands casinos in February 1988 from Summa Corporation for $167 million. The Sands was sold to Sheldon Adelson's Interface Group for $110 million in April 1989.

First casino developments (1989–1999)
In September 1989, the company announced plans for a $700-million Hollywood-themed complex, including a 4,000-room hotel and a theme park. The Desert Inn site was initially considered as a location for the project, but within weeks the location was finalized as the Marina Hotel and Casino and the Tropicana Country Club, which MGM Grand acquired for $93 million plus $30 million in stock. The company put the Desert Inn up for sale to focus efforts on the new project, but found no outside bidders, and agreed to sell it to Tracinda for $130 million. Construction on the MGM Grand Las Vegas and the MGM Grand Adventures theme park began in October 1991, and the property opened in December 1993 at a final cost of $1 billion. The park permanently closed in 2002 due to a lack of interest.

The company moved its headquarters from Beverly Hills to Las Vegas in July 1992.

During construction of the MGM Grand, the company acquired an option to buy an 18-acre site across the street from the project. Gary Primm of Primadonna Resorts approached MGM president Bob Maxey in 1994 with an idea for the site: a casino recreating the New York skyline. A joint venture was formed between the two companies, and construction began in March 1995. Completed at a cost of $460 million, the New York-New York Hotel and Casino opened in January 1997.

With New York-New York under development, MGM Grand made moves to expand in several other markets. An exploratory agreement to develop two casinos on the Chinese island of Hainan was announced in August 1994, but came to nothing. In Darwin, Australia, a lucrative market attracting high rollers from Pacific Rim countries, the company considered building a hotel, but instead bought the Diamond Beach Hotel and Casino, renaming it as the MGM Grand Darwin. MGM announced plans for an Atlantic City casino in July 1996. In Michigan, where voters approved casinos in November 1996, MGM made plans for a bid on one of the three available gaming licenses, which would eventually be approved and open in July 1999 as the MGM Grand Detroit.

In South Africa, with casino gambling newly authorized, MGM announced plans in August 1996 to develop 15 properties in conjunction with Tsogo Sun. The first, a temporary casino in Johannesburg's Sundome, opened in October 1998. Three more casinos followed before MGM agreed to sell out its interest in the properties to Tsogo Sun in November 2001.

Since the initiation of New York-New York, analysts had speculated that MGM Grand or Primadonna would buy out the other's interest in the project. Instead of making such a cash-intensive purchase, however, MGM agreed to buy Primadonna outright for $276 million in stock plus $336 million in assumed debt. The merger closed in March 1999, giving MGM ownership of three casinos and two golf courses at the Nevada–California state line, in addition to full control of New York-New York.

Mirage Resorts merger (2000)
In February 2000, MGM Grand made an unsolicited offer of $17 a share to buy Mirage Resorts, which had foundered due to disappointing results at its new Beau Rivage and Bellagio resorts. Analysts expected a protracted battle, with Mirage founder Steve Wynn seen as unwilling to give up control but under pressure from institutional investors. Mirage rejected the offer, but Wynn met with Kerkorian the next day and named a price of $21 a share. The companies agreed on the higher price, for a total of $4.4 billion plus $2 billion in assumed debt. The merger closed in May 2000, giving MGM ownership of the Mirage, Treasure Island, Bellagio, Boardwalk, and Golden Nugget casinos in Las Vegas, the Golden Nugget in Laughlin, and the Beau Rivage in Mississippi, and a half share of the Monte Carlo. The company changed its name to MGM Mirage in August 2000. Mirage had also owned a half stake in the Borgata, a planned casino in Atlantic City, in a joint venture managed by Boyd Gaming. Work on the Borgata continued apace, and it would open in July 2003.

Stalled developments (2001–2004)
In 2001 and 2002, following the merger with Mirage, the company explored options for its next major development project, including in the Las Vegas, Atlantic City, Chicago, and Macau markets. The 55-acre site of the Boardwalk casino on the Las Vegas Strip was earmarked for a technologically advanced megaresort targeting a Generation X demographic. In Atlantic City, MGM shifted focus from its previously announced boardwalk site to a proposed billion-dollar hotel and casino on a 55-acre tract adjacent to the Borgata, where Wynn had planned to build the Le Jardin casino. In the Chicago market, MGM agreed to pay $600 million to buy the unfinished Emerald Casino in Rosemont, Illinois, whose investors had been accused of ties to organized crime. The deal was rejected, however, by state gaming regulators, and MGM then backed off its effort, saying that Illinois's casino tax was too high. In Macau, where Stanley Ho's 40-year government-granted monopoly on gambling was coming to an end, MGM submitted a bid for one of three available gaming concessions, but it was not selected, losing out to Ho, Las Vegas Sands, and Wynn Resorts.

MGM made moves into the United Kingdom market after a 2001 government report called for loosening of the country's gambling regulations. It opened an online casino, playmgmmirage.com, licensed in the Isle of Man, a British dependency, and it applied for a license to run an online sports betting site in the U.K. It acquired a twenty-five percent stake in a company developing the small Triangle Casino in Bristol, which went on to open its doors in February 2004. It inked deals to build casinos at the Olympia Exhibition Centre in London, St James' Park in Newcastle, Meadowhall Shopping Centre in Sheffield, the National Exhibition Centre in Birmingham, Sportcity in Manchester, Glasgow Harbour, King's Waterfront in Liverpool, and at a proposed stadium in Salford. The company also signed a $490-million deal to acquire Wembley plc, owner of seven greyhound tracks in Britain and four in the United States.

The British expansion plans ultimately amounted to nothing. MGM closed its online casino after less than two years, citing uncertainty in American regulations and competition from established British brands. The Wembley acquisition turned into a bidding war, with MGM finally losing out to an investors group including Kerzner International. The Triangle Casino was sold off to Stanley Leisure in 2006. The company's other development plans were scuttled as the government scaled down, and eventually abandoned, the plan to allow large "super-casinos".

In 2004, the company disposed of some of its smaller properties, selling the two Golden Nugget casinos (Golden Nugget Las Vegas and Golden Nugget Laughlin) to Poster Financial Group for $215 million, and the MGM Grand Darwin to Skycity Entertainment for $140 million.

Mandalay merger (2004–2005)
MGM entered into quiet merger talks with Mandalay Resort Group in early 2004. The potential acquisition would give MGM control of more than half the hotel rooms on the Las Vegas Strip. Mandalay assets attractive to MGM included low-end casinos like Excalibur and Circus Circus to broaden MGM's "high roller" appeal; the Mandalay Bay Convention Center, which would allow MGM to compete directly with the Sands Expo center in the convention market; and at least two prime developable sites on the Strip. The talks went public in June, when MGM announced an offer worth $7.65 billion. Mandalay rejected that offer because of a clause allowing MGM to back out if antitrust regulators demanded the sale of any properties. Analysts speculated that another bidder such as Harrah's or Boyd might enter, but none did, and MGM and Mandalay soon agreed on a $7.9 billion deal.

MGM executives were confident that antitrust regulators would not require the sale of any of the two companies' properties. Michigan law, however, forbade one company from owning multiple casinos, requiring the sale of either the MGM Grand Detroit or Mandalay's 54 percent stake in the MotorCity Casino. After some vacillation about which property to sell, Mandalay accepted a $525-million offer for its interest in MotorCity from Marian Ilitch, the casino's second largest shareholder. Meanwhile, in Illinois, where MGM needed regulatory approval to take over Mandalay's 50 percent interest in the Grand Victoria Casino, a lack of quorum on the state Gaming Board threatened to delay the merger. MGM considered a sale to the casino's other owner, the Pritzker family, but ultimately gained approval for a plan to place the property under control of a trustee until completion of the licensing process. The FTC approved the merger as predicted, and MGM obtained a $7 billion line of credit to finance it. The sale closed on April 25, 2005 for a total of $7.9 billion, including $3 billion in assumed debt.

The Mandalay acquisition made MGM Mirage the largest gaming company in the world, but it was surpassed just two months later when Harrah's Entertainment acquired Caesars Entertainment in a deal that had been spurred on by news of the MGM-Mandalay merger.

Later developments (2004–2006)

Despite MGM's initial failure to win a gaming concession in Macau, the company had remained interested in the burgeoning gaming market. Rumors of a possible partnership with Stanley Ho were reported in 2003, but Nevada gaming regulators informally vetoed the idea because of the alleged involvement of organized crime triads in his casinos. Another possibility emerged when the government allowed the three gaming concessionaires to each sell a sub-concession. In June 2004, MGM formed a joint venture with Pansy Ho, Stanley's daughter, to develop a casino-hotel under a sub-concession from Stanley. Despite initial concerns about whether Pansy Ho was subject to her father's influence, the Nevada Gaming Commission eventually approved the partnership. Construction of the MGM Grand Macau began in June 2005. The property opened in December 2007, completed at a cost of $1.25 billion.

In 2004, MGM solidified its plans for the Boardwalk site on the Strip, announcing Project CityCenter, an $8-billion high-density project including hotels, condominiums, a casino, and a shopping mall. The Boardwalk was closed in January 2006 to make way for the redevelopment, and CityCenter construction began the following June.

Singapore emerged in 2004 as the next major new Asian gaming market, calling for proposals to build two "integrated resort" casinos at Marina Bay and the island of Sentosa. MGM partnered with CapitaLand in an estimated $3 billion bid for the Marina Bay site. Their bid advanced to the final stage against three competitors, and was seen as the favorite to win. The government awarded the license, however, to Las Vegas Sands, citing its strength in the meetings and conventions sector.

On April 25, 2006, MGM Mirage announced with Foxwoods Resort and Casino a joint partnership in developing an expansion plan at Foxwoods that will include a casino using the MGM Grand brand. On October 16, 2006, MGM Mirage announced that it planned to sell its properties in Laughlin (Colorado Belle Hotel & Casino and Edgewater Hotel and Casino) to a partnership of Anthony Marnell III and Sher Gaming. The sale price was $200 million. The sale closed on June 1, 2007. On October 31, 2006, MGM Mirage announced plans to sell Primm Valley Resorts to Herbst Gaming for $400 million. The proposed sale would not include the Primm Valley Golf Club. The sale closed on April 10, 2007.

The Nevada Landing Hotel and Casino closed a month earlier than planned on March 20, 2007.

Dubai World investment (2007–2009)
On April 19, 2007 the company announced that it planned to purchase a  site from Concord Wilshire Partners for $130 million and a  site from Gordon Gaming for $444 million.  The two parcels give the company complete control of the southwest corner of the Sahara and Las Vegas Boulevard intersection.  When combined with underused parts of the Circus Circus site, the company will have a  site for future development.  The Concord site had been the proposed location for the Maxim Casino.

On August 22, 2007, Dubai World said it would buy a 9.5 percent stake in MGM for about $2.4 billion. It would also invest about $2.7 billion to acquire a 50 percent stake in MGM's CityCenter project. Dubai World would pay MGM Mirage an additional $100 million if the project opened on time and on budget. The investment firm would buy 14.2 million shares from MGM Mirage. The firm would also issue a public tender for an additional 14.2 million shares at the same price.

On October 29, 2008, MGM Mirage halted a $5 billion Atlantic City project on land next to the Borgata.

At about the same time, New Jersey gambling regulators were evaluating MGM Mirage's suitability to operate casinos in New Jersey, and were unconvinced that MGM Mirage's Macau partner, Pansy Ho, could operate independently from influence of her father, Stanley Ho.  The latter was often accused of ties with Chinese organized crime and letting the gangs operate in his casinos' VIP rooms. Faced with not complying with New Jersey gaming regulations, MGM Mirage decided to divest the highly profitable Borgata in order to continue pursuing the even more lucrative Chinese market.  MGM Mirage subsequently transferred its 50% share in the Borgata to a divestiture trust through which it received all benefit of the ownership.  The trust was responsible for selling MGM's interest within 30 months, although MGM had the right to direct the trustee during the first 18 months.

On December 16, 2008, MGM Mirage announced the sale of its Las Vegas Treasure Island resort and casino to billionaire Phil Ruffin. The sale was completed on March 20, 2009 for $600 million in cash plus a $175 million promissory note.

On March 23, 2009 Dubai World and Infinity World announced that they had filed a lawsuit in the Delaware Chancery Court seeking to be released from their CityCenter joint venture agreement with MGM Mirage after the company filed its annual report stating that "there is substantial doubt about our ability to continue as a going concern," and "it cannot provide assurance that its business would generate sufficient cash flow from operation."

Starting on April 6, 2009 news reports surfaced that MGM Mirage had hired investment firm Morgan Stanley to assist the company in finding possible buyers for the MGM Grand Detroit and the Beau Rivage.

Name change and recent years (2010–present)
On June 15, 2010, shareholders approved a name change from MGM Mirage to "MGM Resorts International", to emphasize the brand's global scope and increased non-gaming strategy.

In April 2011 an initial public offering was announced for the MGM Macau property. Under the agreement, Pansy Ho would receive a 29 percent stake in the company, MGM China Holdings Ltd, which was created as a listing vehicle for the IPO. MGM Resorts would hold 51 percent and the public would receive 20 percent. MGM China raised $1.5 billion from its IPO on the Hong Kong Stock Exchange. In January 2013, MGM China received government approval to build its second resort in Macau.
In 2013, MGM won state licenses to build a $1-billion resort in National Harbor, Maryland and a $950-million resort in downtown Springfield, Massachusetts. In May 2014, MGM broke ground on a $375-million arena on the Las Vegas Strip with sports and entertainment company AEG.

In 2013, Foxwoods and MGM ended their relationship, and the MGM Grand at Foxwoods was renamed the Fox Tower.
On May 1, 2014, the company broke ground on the $375-million T-Mobile Arena located behind New-New York Hotel and Casino, in partnership with AEG Live. The arena opened on April 6, 2016. In September 2014, MGM purchased the naming rights for a new baseball stadium in Biloxi, resulting in MGM Park. That same year, the Massachusetts Gaming Commission approved a license for MGM Springfield, an $800-million project.

MGM sold several properties in 2015, including the Railroad Pass Casino, the Gold Strike, and properties in Reno (Circus Circus Reno and a 50 percent stake in the Silver Legacy) were sold to Eldorado Resorts for $72.5 million.

In April 2016, MGM sold The Shops at Crystals, a high-end mall attached to CityCenter.  MGM sold the mall to Invesco Real Estate and Simon Property Group for $1.1B. Notable tentants included Louis Vuitton, Gucci, Dolce & Gabbana, Tom Ford, Prada, Fendi and Tiffany & Co.

In April 2016, MGM held an initial public offering for MGM Growth Properties (MGP), a new real estate investment trust (REIT) with ownership of ten of the company's casinos; the parent company would continue to operate the casinos under a lease agreement. The offering raised $1.05 billion, and left MGM Resorts with 76 percent ownership of the REIT. In June 2016, MGM announced a joint venture with Sydell Group to renovate and rebrand the Monte Carlo as the Park MGM, named after the adjacent dining and entertainment district, The Park, that opened in April 2016. In August 2016, MGM bought out Boyd Gaming's interest in the Borgata for $900 million, and then sold the property to MGP for $1.2 billion and leased it back for $100 million per year.

In 2017, MGM launched two online ventures under the PlayMGM brand: an online sportsbook in Nevada, and an online casino in New Jersey.
In October 2017, MGM purchased the San Antonio Stars of the Women's National Basketball Association. The team was moved to Mandalay Bay Events Center and began play as the Las Vegas Aces in 2018. In August 2018, MGM and Hyatt sold the Grand Victoria Casino to Eldorado Resorts for $328 million. In January 2019, MGM bought Yonkers Raceway and Empire City Casino in New York from the Rooney family for $850 million, and then immediately sold the land and buildings to MGP for $625 million, and leased them back for $50 million per year.

In 2018, MGM Resorts signed a gaming partnership with NFL team the New York Jets.

in 2019, MGM sold two resorts on the Las Vegas strip: Bellagio and Circus Circus. They sold their real estate assets of Bellagio to Blackstone Group while selling Circus Circus to Phil Ruffin. In 2020, they sold their real estate assets of MGM Grand and Mandalay Bay to a joint venture between Blackstone and mgm growth properties.

in 2021, they bought 50% of Dubai world’s share of city center and sold the real estate assets of Aria and Vdara to Blackstone and later purchased the operating assets of Cosmopolitan of Las Vegas and later sold the Mirage to Hard Rock International.

Response to the COVID-19 pandemic
In August 2020, MGM cut 18,000 job positions as a result of the effects of the COVID-19 pandemic. The job cuts represent one fourth of its workforce, which before the start of the pandemic was 68,000.

Attempts to block tribal casino developments 
MGM lobbied the Trump administration against giving federal approval for a casino operated by two native tribes in East Windsor, Connecticut. The casino would have provided competition to a MGM casino across the border in Massachusetts.

MGM Hospitality
In 2007, MGM Hospitality was established to operate hotels, resorts and residences in key destinations around the globe using the brands of Bellagio, MGM Grand and Skylofts.

In 2009, the company formed Diaoyutai MGM Hospitality, a joint venture with Diaoyutai State Guesthouse of China (the Chinese Foreign Ministry’s venue for VIPs) which develops and operates 5-star hotels and resorts in China.

In 2014, MGM and Hakkasan Group announced the formation of a joint venture named MGM Hakkasan Hospitality, which would develop non-gaming hotels around the world. The partnership was terminated a year later.

BetMGM

Following the U.S. Supreme Court's May 2018 ruling that struck down the PASPA sports betting ban, in July 2018, MGM announced a 50/50 joint venture with UK gambling operator GVC Holdings (now known as Entain) to create a sports betting and online gaming platform targeting the U.S. market in states where such activities are legal. In January 2019, the joint venture was named Roar Digital. Additionally with the move into sports betting MGM announced official partnerships with several North American professional sports leagues, including the National Basketball Association, the National Hockey League, and Major League Baseball.

In September of the same year, the company announced a partnership with sports bar chain restaurant Buffalo Wild Wings. The partnership will involve Buffalo Wild Wings sports bars across the country showcasing custom sportsbook content on TV screens inside the bars, featuring live odds provided by BetMGM, as well as the establishment of three new Buffalo Wild Wings sports bars within MGM properties or in partnership with BetMGM as additional states come online. At the end of October 2019, the company established a betting partnership with Yahoo Sports to connect its sports betting online platform to the popular sports website. At the end of October 2019, the company established a betting partnership with Yahoo Sports to connect its sports betting online platform to the popular fantasy sports platform.

In addition to the company's partnerships with leagues, on July 9, 2020, BetMGM announced an exclusive betting partnership with the Denver Broncos of the National Football League. BetMGM would follow this deal with multiple betting partnerships with other NFL teams, including the Detroit Lions, Las Vegas Raiders, Tennessee Titans, and Pittsburgh Steelers. In late 2020 through early 2021, BetMGM continued to develop its partnership library with other teams in other leagues, including the Detroit Red Wings of the NHL, Washington Nationals of MLB, and Philadelphia 76ers of the NBA, as well as with other business ventures like TopGolf to extend the company's brand image to new bettors in operating markets. In May 2021, BetMGM signed a deal with the Baltimore Ravens to become the official gaming partner of the NFL team.

On November 8, 2021, BetMGM, along with 8 other sports gaming operators, were awarded sports betting licenses by the New York State Gaming Commission. New York will be the largest sports gaming market in the United States when operators launch their applications in 2022. Additionally, on the same day, BetMGM agreed to a multi-year marketing partnership with Madison Square Garden Sports and will become an official sports gaming sponsor for both the New York Knicks of the NBA and New York Rangers of the NHL.

On September 14, 2022, BetMGM entered into a naming rights agreement with NJ Transit to becoming the naming sponsor of the Meadowlands Rail Line for $3 million over the next 3 years. The rail line is a special event shuttle train that offers rail service to and from MetLife Stadium only during New York Giants and New York Jets home football games, as well as major concerts and other sporting events.

MGM Resorts International properties
All U.S. properties (excluding golf courses and where otherwise indicated) are fully owned by Vici Properties and operated by MGM through a long-term triple net lease agreement.

Las Vegas Strip
 Bellagio (leased from The Blackstone Group)
 The Cosmopolitan of Las Vegas (leased from Blackstone, Cherng Family Trust, and Stonepeak Partners)
 CityCenter (leased from Blackstone)
 Aria Resort & Casino
 Vdara
 Park MGM
 New York-New York
 T-Mobile Arena (42.5% ownership stake by MGM Resorts International)
 MGM Grand Las Vegas
 MGM Grand Garden Arena
 Skylofts at MGM Grand
 The Mansion at MGM Grand
 The Signature at MGM Grand
 Excalibur
 Luxor
 Mandalay Bay 
 Delano Las Vegas
 Mandalay Bay Convention Center
 Michelob Ultra Arena

China
 Diaoyutai MGM Hospitality – China (joint venture with Diaoyutai State Guesthouse)
 Bellagio Shanghai – Shanghai
 Diaoyutai Boutique Hotel Chengdu – Chengdu
 Diaoyutai Hotel Hangzhou – Hangzhou
 MGM Grand Sanya – Sanya
 MGM China  – Macau, China (56% ownership stake)
 MGM Cotai – Cotai
 MGM Macau – Sé

Other properties
 Beau Rivage – Biloxi, Mississippi
 Borgata – Atlantic City, New Jersey
 MGM Grand Detroit – Detroit, Michigan (98% ownership stake)
 MGM National Harbor – National Harbor, Maryland 
 MGM Northfield Park – Northfield, Ohio
 MGM Springfield – Springfield, Massachusetts 
 Yonkers Raceway & Empire City Casino – Yonkers, New York

Golf courses
 Dragon Ridge Country Club – Las Vegas, Nevada
 Fallen Oak Golf Course – Saucier, Mississippi
 Primm Valley Golf Club – Nipton, California
 Reflection Bay Golf Course – Las Vegas, Nevada
 Shadow Creek Golf Course – Las Vegas, Nevada

Former properties
 Boardwalk Hotel and Casino – Las Vegas, Nevada
 Circus Circus Las Vegas
 Adventuredome
 Slots-A-Fun Casino
 Circus Circus, Reno, Nevada
 Colorado Belle, Laughlin, Nevada
Desert Inn
 Edgewater, Laughlin, Nevada
 Gold Strike Casino Resort – Tunica Resorts, Mississippi
 Gold Strike Hotel and Gambling Hall, Jean, Nevada
Golden Nugget Las Vegas
Golden Nugget Laughlin
Grand Victoria Casino Elgin – Elgin, Illinois (50% joint venture with Hyatt)
Mandarin Oriental, Las Vegas
MGM Grand Adventures Theme Park
MGM Grand Air
MGM Grand Darwin – Darwin, Northern Territory, Australia
MGM Grand at Foxwoods
 MGM Grand Ho Tram Strip – Xuyen Moc, Vietnam
 The Mirage
 Nevada Landing Hotel and Casino – Jean, Nevada
 Primm Valley Resorts
 Railroad Pass, Henderson, Nevada
Sands Hotel and Casino
 Silver Legacy, Reno, Nevada (50% owner in partnership with Eldorado Resorts)
The Shops at Crystals
 Treasure Island Hotel and Casino – Las Vegas, Nevada
 Las Vegas Festival Grounds
Las Vegas Village

MGM International Aviation

The MGM Resorts International Aviation fleet comprises five aircraft (as of March 2020):

Staff and management
The company's top executives include: James Murren, chairman and chief executive officer; Bill Hornbuckle, president of global casino marketing; Brian Sandoval, president of global gambling development; Corey I. Sanders, chief operating officer; and John McManus, executive vice president, general counsel and secretary.
 
As of 2015, according to the company, among the company's management ranks, more than 38 percent are minorities and nearly 43 percent are women. The company has received wide recognition for its diversity and inclusion initiatives, such as: 40 Best Companies for Diversity (Black Enterprise Magazine), Top 10 Companies for Latinos (DiversityInc Magazine), Best Places to Work for LGBT Equality (Human Rights Campaign Foundation), Top 10 Regional Companies(DiversityInc) and Top Corporation for Women's Business Enterprises (Women's Business Enterprise National Council). Fortune magazine named MGM Resorts one of the World's Most Admired Companies in 2017.

Controversy
MGM Resorts International received criticism for filing a lawsuit on July 18, 2018 against survivors and relatives of victims slain in the October 1, 2017 Las Vegas shooting. MGM has claimed that, because it utilized the security services of Contemporary Services Corporation, a vendor certified by the Department of Homeland Security at the time of the October 1 shooting, any proceedings should be held in federal court where MGM is shielded from liability by the Support Anti-Terrorism by Fostering Effective Technologies Act, also known as the Safety Act. MGM said they are insured for $751 million towards the settlement of the lawsuit which MGM believes will be settled in May 2020. Robert Englet, an attorney to some of the survivors, describes the countersuit as an attempt to get a more favorable judge. Brian Claypool, another attorney of the survivors', called the lawsuits a “public relations nightmare”. MGM's controversial action prompted a public outcry from survivors of the shooting, family members of the victims, lawmakers, and media members in New York State urging the New York State Gaming Commission to block MGM from completing its $850 million deal to purchase Empire City Casino and Yonkers Raceway in Yonkers, New York, which deal had been scheduled to close in January 2019. In October 2019, MGM agreed to pay victims and survivors up to $800 million.

Awards and recognition
The company continues to receive wide recognition for its diversity and inclusion initiatives, such as: 40 Best Companies for Diversity (Black Enterprise Magazine) in 2012, Best Places to Work for LGBT Equality (Human Rights Campaign Foundation) in 2013, Top 10 Regional Companies (DiversityInc) in 2014, Top 10 Companies for Latinos (DiversityInc Magazine),  and top 100 Companies for MBA Students (Universum Global) in 2014. Fortune has named MGM Resorts one of the World's Most Admired Companies.

References

External links

 

 
1986 establishments in Nevada
Companies based in Paradise, Nevada
Gambling companies established in 2000
Hospitality companies established in 2000
Companies listed on the New York Stock Exchange
Gambling companies of the United States
Hospitality companies of the United States
Las Vegas Aces owners